Anne Marie Heiler (March 21, 1889 – December 17, 1979) was a German politician of the Christian Democratic Union (CDU) and former member of the German Bundestag.

Life 
In 1949 she became a member of the first Bundestag via the state list of the Hessian CDU.

Literature

References

1889 births
1979 deaths
Members of the Bundestag for Hesse
Members of the Bundestag 1949–1953
Female members of the Bundestag
20th-century German women politicians
Members of the Bundestag for the Christian Democratic Union of Germany